Rafael Rodríguez Vargas is a Puerto Rican politician and former senator. He was a member of the Senate of Puerto Rico from 2001 to 2004 representing the Popular Democratic Party (PPD).

Rodríguez first ran for senator at the 1996 general elections but lost to the candidates of the New Progressive Party. He ran again at the 2000 general elections, winning a seat for the next four years.

At the 2004 general elections, Rodríguez lost to the candidates of the PNP. Rodríguez tried to win a slot for the 2012 general elections, but arrived in fifth place at the PPD primaries earlier that year.

References

Members of the Senate of Puerto Rico
Popular Democratic Party (Puerto Rico) politicians
Living people
Year of birth missing (living people)